Brian Johnson Jr. (born May 17, 1979) is an American stock car racing driver. He last drove the No. 73 Chevrolet Silverado for Tagsby Racing in the NASCAR Camping World Truck Series.

Racing career
Johnson started competing in the ASA Midwest Tour in 2007, he competed in ten events and posted four top tens and two top fives and finished 10th in the point standings.  In 2008 he competed on a part-time basis in the ARCA West Series racing in three events, posting a win at Auto Clearing Motor Speedway along with two top fives and two top tens as well as one pole.  Johnson would win the 2009 ARCA West Series Championship in domination fashion.  He posted three wins, five top fives, six top tens and five poles in eight total races.

NASCAR
In March 2010, Johnson signed on to drive select races with Ray Hackett Racing starting with the Kroger 250 at Martinsville Speedway. Johnson started the race in 28th position and finished 32nd after a Lap 114 accident.  In Johnson's next race, the Nashville 200 at Nashville Superspeedway, he would start 31st and finish in 30th position.

Motorsports career results

NASCAR
(key) (Bold – Pole position awarded by qualifying time. Italics – Pole position earned by points standings or practice time. * – Most laps led.)

Camping World Truck Series

ARCA Re/Max Series
(key) (Bold – Pole position awarded by qualifying time. Italics – Pole position earned by points standings or practice time. * – Most laps led.)

References

External links
 
 

Living people
1979 births
People from Winnebago County, Illinois
Racing drivers from Illinois
NASCAR drivers
ARCA Midwest Tour drivers
ARCA Menards Series drivers